Jeri Al Samir (also spelled Jeri Al Sammar and Jeri Al Samur) is a village in the municipality of Umm Salal in Qatar. It is located in the central-southern part of the municipality near the border with Al Rayyan Municipality.

Etymology
Jeri originates from the Arabic word qeri, which refers to an area where water aggregates and facilitates the growth of various vegetation. The second part of the village's name, Samir, is the name of a prominent man who used to reside there.

Infrastructure
In 2015, the Ministry of Economy and Trade announced that it would be commencing the development of a logistics center in the village at a cost of QR 331 million. The area was selected because of its strategic location near the Orbital Highway and because of relatively lower operation costs. Once fully completed, the logistics center will host facilities for 21 companies in the fields of auto parts and machinery, food and beverages, warehousing and storage, and construction.

References 

Populated places in Umm Salal